Suwini de Alwis (born 17 May 1975) is a Sri Lankan cricketer.

References

1975 births
Living people
Sri Lankan women cricketers
Sri Lanka women One Day International cricketers
Sri Lanka women Twenty20 International cricketers
Cricketers from Kandy
Marians women cricketers